Ragini Khanna (born 9 December 1987) is an Indian film and television actress,model,comedian,singer and television host. She has hosted various reality shows, such as India's Best Dramebaaz (2013) and Gangs of Haseepur (2014). She is best known for her role as Bharti in Bhaskar Bharti and Suhana Kashyap in Sasural Genda Phool. She was a contestant on Jhalak Dikhhla Jaa 4 in 2010. She also appeared in Comedy Nights with Kapil portraying many characters.

Early life
Khanna's parents are Praveen Khanna and Kamini Khanna. She is the 2nd child of her parents. Her elder brother, Amit Khanna is also an actor and has worked in serials like Yeh Dil Chahe More. Her mother, Kaamini Khanna is a writer, music director, singer, anchor and founder of 'Beauty with Astrology'. She is the granddaughter of classical singer Nirmala Devi and popular 1940s actor Arun Ahuja. She is also the niece of Indian actor Govinda and the cousin of Krushna Abhishek (actor, stand-up comedian), Arti Singh (TV actress) and Soumya Seth (TV actress). Khanna's father died in October 2015.

Career

Television 
Khanna made her acting debut with the daily soap opera Radhaa Ki Betiyaan Kuch Kar Dikhayengi on NDTV Imagine as "Ragini Sharma". In 2009, Khanna played in Sony TV's comedy show Bhaskar Bharti. Khanna also appeared as a guest in an episode of 10 Ka Dum, Khanna won an amount of 1,000,000 rupees and donated the money for charity. She was also seen as a guest in Imagine TV's reality show Big Money: Chota Parda Bada Game.

In March 2010, Khanna appeared in Star Plus's show Sasural Genda Phool. She played the lead role as Suhana Kashyap, an arrogant, but good at heart woman who marries a man of a middle class joint family. The show went off air on 21 April 2012. Her portrayal as Suhana won her some awards including BIG Star Most Entertaining Television Actor - Female. She also appeared in a special episode of Kaun Banega Crorepati 4.

In December 2010, Khanna participated in the 4th season of Jhalak Dikhhla Jaa. and was eliminated at 9th position on 14 February 2011. In 2011, Khanna participated in a celebrity singing reality show Star Ya Rockstar on Zee TV. Khanna's next project was the 5th season of Jhalak Dikhhla Jaa as host. She also did a cameo role in Life OK's show Main Lakshmi Tere Aangan Ki. In January 2013, Khanna was seen in Life OK's cookery show Welcome - Baazi Mehmaan-Nawaazi ki. She appeared in Comedy Nights with Kapil and Comedy Nights Live. In 2016, Khanna hosted a show on ABP News called Good Morning with Ragini Khanna.

Films
In 2011, Khanna made her Hindi Film debut with Rakeysh Omprakash Mehra's comedy film Teen They Bhai.
In 2013, Khanna worked in Punjabi film Bhaji in Problem. the film earned a good box office collection. Khanna is scheduled to feature opposite Nawazuddin Siddiqui in Pushpendra Mishra's comedy film Ghoomketu which released in 2020 in ZEE5 platform on 22 May 2020 instead of theatrical release due to COVID-19 pandemic in India.

In the media 
Khanna is known for her frank and assertive nature, and has been outspoken on issues including the commercialisation of festivals such as Navratri. 

During a shoot of Star Ya Rockstar, the actress reacted defensively when fellow contestants expressed their preference for the performance of another contestant, Chhavi Mittal. In an interview after her elimination from the show, Khanna said, "I always motivated Chhavi whenever she was nervous before her performance. I think I have a certain aura which prompts people to like me. I am always nice to people who are nice to me. I don't throw tantrums for any rhyme or reason." During Life OK's culinary show Welcome, Khanna and her co-contestant Nigaar Khan were seen arguing during the show. Khanna vented her anger against the channel through her Twitter account, where she claimed that in an episode of the show, Khanna's mother's name was mispronounced in a demeaning fashion.

Other works and appearances
In 2010, Khanna hosted Diwali Dilo Ki, a Diwali celebration event by Star Plus. 

In 2011 Khanna hosted the music launch of Ra.One, a Bollywood science-fiction starring Shah Rukh Khan and Kareena Kapoor. Khanna then hosted another instalment of Diwali celebration events by Star Plus for the year 2011. The event was titled Diwali Rishton Ki Mithas and Khanna hosted various segments of that event. She also appeared in the promotional video of Ruk Jana Nahi (another Star Plus serial) along with fellow Star Plus actresses Deepika Singh, Nia Sharma and Pooja Gaur.

TV commercials and endorsements 
Khanna is the brand ambassador of 'Beauty with Astrology' science organisation founded by her mother, Kamini Khanna. They have also launched an early morning spiritual and wellness radio show titled 'Seher' on 92.7 BIG FM with Khanna as the brand ambassador. In 2010, Khanna was roped in as judge in Frito-Lay India's consumer campaign titled "Kurkure Spend Time with Family".

Khanna has also walked the ramp at Lakme Fashion Week, IIJW and for various other designers. 

Khanna was also the brand ambassador of "Mix n Drink" campaign launched by Catch foods] in 2011. In 2013, Khanna featured in the "My Roohafza story" activation campaign launched by Hamdard division.

Filmography

Films

Television

Special appearances

Accolades

References

External links

 
 
 

1987 births
Living people
Place of birth missing (living people)
Indian television actresses
Indian soap opera actresses
Indian film actresses
Actresses in Hindi cinema
21st-century Indian actresses